Turnpike Bluff is a conspicuous rock formation in Antarctica. First mapped in 1957 by the Commonwealth Trans-Antarctic Expedition, and so named because it marks entry to a crevassed area of Recovery Glacier through which the Expedition's vehicles had difficulty in passing on their journey from Shackleton Base to the South Pole in 1957, it lies five nautical miles (9 km) southwest of Mount Homard, at the southwest extremity of the Shackleton Range.

Geology
The Turnpike Bluff Group is a sedimentary sequence of rocks exposed on the south flank of the Shackleton Range.  The sequence includes basal clastics and quartzite, followed by carbonate-bearing clastics with Riphean age stromatolite colonies, and capped by over 1 km of greywacke and quartzitic arenite, alternating with pelite.  The sequence is underlain unconformably by an Archean granitoid basement (1400 Ma).  Metamorphism occurred at 526 Ma.

References

Cliffs of Coats Land